Mut-vitz is a fair trade certified coffee cooperative in the Mut-vitz, Zapatista area in Chiapas, in the south of Mexico.

It was founded in 1997, and forcibly dissolved by the Government of Chiapas in 2009, and is located in San Juan de la Libertad (current municipality of El Bosque, Chiapas).

History 
In 1997, around 200 producers founded Mut-vitz, taking the name of a mountain near the cooperative.

In 1998, they received the CertiMex certificate and the license to export. The cooperative already had 750 members.

In 2004, Mut-vitz had 643 coffee farmers.

The company forcibly dissolved by the Government of Chiapas in 2009.

See also

Zapatista coffee cooperatives

External links
Homepage

References 

Fair trade organizations
Agriculture companies of Mexico
Coffee companies
Mexican brands
Drink companies of Mexico
Coffee in North America